Fazal Elahi Wazir Abadi (12 August 1882 – 5 May 1951) was a Pakistani Islamic scholar and freedom fighter.

Biography
Fazal Ilahi Wazirabadi received his early education from Scotch Mission School at Wazirabad. At an early age, he studied the Quran with translation and theology from Abdul Mannan Wazirabadi.

Wazirabadi died on 5 May 1951. He had bequeathed to be taken to Balakot and buried. Therefore, the body was taken by truck to Balakot and buried in the graveyard, where Syed Ahmad Barelvi and Shah Ismail Dehlvi are also laid to rest.

Literary works
Wazirabadi's books include:
 Jihād-i Kashmīr
 Masʼalah-i jihād-i Kashmīr aur us kī muk̲h̲taṣar tārīk̲h̲
 Kavāʼif-i Yāg̲h̲istān

References

1882 births
1951 deaths
People from Wazirabad
Pakistani Muslim scholars of Islam
Pakistani Islamic religious leaders
Muslim missionaries